Odontosia sieversii is a moth of the  family Notodontidae. It is found from northern and central Europe to northern China and Japan.

The wingspan is 39–49 mm. Adults are on wing from the end of March to May.

The larvae feed on Betula species. Larvae can be found from April to May. The species overwinters as a pupa.

External links
Norges sommerfugler

Notodontidae
Moths of Japan
Moths of Europe
Moths described in 1856